The 2010–11 América season was the 64th professional season of Mexico's top-flight football league. The season is split into two tournaments—the Torneo Apertura and the Torneo Clausura—each with identical formats and each contested by the same eighteen teams. América will begin their season on July 24, 2010 against Pachuca.

Torneo Apertura

Squad

Reserve team

Long-term injuries

Out on loan 

}

Apertura 2010 results

Regular season

Final Phase 

América won 4-1 on aggregate

Goalscorers

Results

Results summary

Results by round

Torneo Clausura

Current squad

Reserve team

Out on loan

Clausura 2011 results

Regular season

Final phase 

Morelia won 5–3 on aggregate

Goalscorers

Results

Results summary

Results by round

References 

2010–11 Primera División de México season
2010
Mexican football clubs 2010–11 season